WACF may refer to:

 WACF-LP, a radio station (98.1 FM) licensed to Brookfield, Massachusetts
 WJRB, a radio station (95.1 FM) licensed to Young Harris, Georgia, which held the call sign WACF from 2007 to 2012
 WWVR (FM), a radio station (98.5 FM) licensed to Young Harris, Georgia, which held the call sign WACF from 1974 to 2006
 Women and children first, a triage code of conduct